Cutaneous ciliated cysts are a cutaneous condition characterized by solitary cysts located on the legs of females.

See also 
 Cutaneous columnar cyst
 Skin lesion

References 

Epidermal nevi, neoplasms, and cysts